Body is a surname. Notable people with the surname include:

Agnes Body (1866–1952), British headmistress
George Body (1840–1911), English canon of Durham
János Bódy (b. 1932), Hungarian modern pentathlete
Jenny Body, British aerospace engineer
Marion Body (b. 1960), American football player
Patrick Body (b. 1982), American football player
Richard Body (1927–2018), English politician

Kaden Zane Body  (b.1999) Hunter